Alloptidae is a family of mites belonging to the order Sarcoptiformes.

Genera 
Genera:

 Alloptellus Dubinin, 1955
 Alloptes Canestrini, 1879
 Alloptoides Gaud, 1961
 Anisanchus Peterson & Atyeo, 1977
 Aramolichus Peterson & Atyeo, 1968
 Brephosceles Hull, 1934
 Ceraturoptellus Cerny, 1969
 Dichobrephosceles Peterson & Atyeo, 1968
 Dinalloptes Gaud & Mouchet, 1957
 Diomedalloptes Mironov, 1998
 Echinacarus Dubinin, 1949
 Fregatocolus Atyeo & Peterson, 1992
 Gaudium Peterson & Atyeo, 1972
 Heterobrephosceles Peterson & Atyeo, 1978
 Homeobrephosceles Peterson & Atyeo, 1968
 Hyperpedalloptes Dubinin, 1955
 Ibidocolus Mironov, 1998
 Laminalloptes Dubinin, 1955
 Megalloptes Mironov & Perez, 2001
 Nealloptes Gaud & Mouchet, 1957
 Onychalloptes Peterson & Atyeo, 1968
 Oxyalges Gaud & Mouchet, 1959
 Paradoxalloptes Mironov, 1999
 Plicatalloptes Dubinin, 1955
 Psilobrephosceles Peterson & Atyeo, 1968
 Ptyctalloptes Mironov, 2002
 Rhynchalloptes Peterson & Atyeo, 1977
 Spinicnemis Mironov, 2002
 Tauralloptes Mironov, 2002
 Thyzanocercus Gaud & Mouchet, 1957

References 

Acari